Pär Anders Nuder (born 27 February 1963) is a Swedish Social Democratic politician. He served as Minister for Finance from 2004 to 2006, Minister for Policy Coordination and State Secretary and Chief of Staff to Prime Minister Göran Persson 1997–2002.

Today he serves as chairman of the Third Swedish National Pension Fund (AP3), one of Sweden's leading pension companies AMF and Hemsö, and on the board of several Nordic companies. Pär Nuder is a senior counselor at Albright Stonebridge Group and an industrial advisor to the private-equity firm EQT Partners.

Biography
Pär Nuder grew up in Österåker, where he still resides. His father, Ants Nuder, was one of the numerous Estonian refugees who fled to Sweden to escape the Soviet invasion at the end of World War II. During his childhood, Pär Nuder spent several summers in Israel, which has resulted in a strong personal commitment to the Middle East peace process. Educated at Stockholm University, Nuder has a Bachelor of Laws degree.

Career

Politics
His political path began in the local Swedish Social Democratic Youth League club. From 1986 to 1989 he was the chairman of the Stockholm County branch of the organisation and from 1987 to 1990 he was a member of the national board. At the same time he was a member of the Österåker municipal executive committee, from 1982 to 1994. In 1986 he started his career as a political adviser, first to the minister for justice (before being forced to resign in October 1987 as a result of the political fallout of the Soviet spy Stig Bergling's escape from custody) and later to the prime minister, first to Ingvar Carlsson and later to his successor, Göran Persson. For a few years he also worked as a political secretary to the Social Democratic parliamentary party group. In 1994 he was elected a member of parliament.

In 1997 he was offered the position of state secretary in the prime minister's office. Although he was more or less unknown to the general public at the time, he was generally believed to be Göran Persson's close ally and one of his personal favourites to succeed him as party leader and Prime Minister. This impression was further strengthened by Persson's move to let Nuder join his Cabinet as Minister for Policy Coordination in 2002, an influential behind-the-scenes post. When Marita Ulvskog stepped down as Minister for Culture in September 2004 he took over the portfolio, although it was explicitly stated that this was not a long-term solution. The Prime Minister's intentions instead became public on 21 October 2004, when Göran Persson announced a restructuring of his government in which Pär Nuder was to take over as Minister of Finance after Bosse Ringholm.

Responding to media questions on whether his plan was to be the next Prime Minister, he simply answered that he did not "think about it" and was concentrating on his tasks as Minister of Finance. He also restated the government's goal to get the rate of open unemployment below four percent again.

In December 2004 he introduced the controversial term köttberg (mountain of meat) to describe the baby boomer generation (born in the 1940s) during a speech. This speech addressed the potential pension bomb Sweden is facing.

During early 2008, he lost his position as Social Democratic candidate for finance minister due to quarrels with party leader Mona Sahlin. Nuder himself replied: "If [Mona Sahlin] believes there is another person better suited to speak for the economic policy of Social Democracy in Sweden, then I won't hesitate to step aside for that person." He was succeeded as economic advisor for the Social Democratic party and its candidate for finance minister for the election in 2010 by Thomas Östros, earlier Minister of Education.

Private sector
Pär Nuder is currently chairman of the Third National Pension Fund (AP3) and a board member of several companies in Sweden. He is a senior counselor of the strategy firm Albright Stonebridge Group, advising clients on financial trends and providing strategic advice to clients seeking to enter the European market. He is an advisor to the private-equity fund EQT and several other Nordic companies and a member of the President's Advisory Council, Tokyo University.

He is a columnist at the business newspaper Dagens industri and has written an autobiography called Stolt men inte nöjd: en kärleksförklaring till politiken.

References

External links

1963 births
Living people
People from Täby Municipality
Swedish people of Estonian descent
Swedish Social Democratic Party politicians
Swedish Ministers for Finance
Stockholm University alumni
Members of the Riksdag 2002–2006